Starodubsky (masculine), Starodubskaya (feminine), or Starodubskoye (neuter) is the name of several rural localities in Russia:
Starodubskoye, Sakhalin Oblast, a selo in Dolinsky District of Sakhalin Oblast
Starodubskoye, Stavropol Krai, a selo in Starodubsky Selsoviet of Budyonnovsky District of Stavropol Krai